Mount Madison is a  mountain in the Presidential Range of New Hampshire in the United States. It is named after the fourth U.S. President, James Madison.

Mountains in the Presidential Range are named for U.S. presidents, with the tallest (Mount Washington) named for the first president, the second tallest (Mount Adams) for the second president, and so on. However, due to a surveying error, Mount Monroe, named after the fifth president, James Monroe, is actually  taller than Mount Madison.

There are many hiking trails on the mountain.  A stretch of the Appalachian Trail traverses just below its summit on the Osgood Trail.  The Madison Spring Hut, maintained by the Appalachian Mountain Club, is nestled between Mount Madison and Mount Adams and provides rustic lodging in the summer. Reservations generally need to be made far in advance.

Mount Madison is the northernmost peak in the Presidentials. Like most of the range, its summit is above treeline.  Due to high winds and low temperatures, hypothermia is a danger even in the summer.

Gallery

See also 

 Four-thousand footers of New Hampshire
 Randolph Mountain Club

References

External links
 Mount Madison at summitpost.org
 Paintings of Mount Madison
 Hiking Mount Madison

Mountains of New Hampshire
White Mountains (New Hampshire)
Mountains of Coös County, New Hampshire
New England Four-thousand footers
Mountains on the Appalachian Trail